Bandrani-Mtangani is a village on the island of Anjouan in the Comoros. According to the 1991 census the village had a population of 1,981. The current estimate for 2009 is 3,486 people

References

Populated places in Anjouan